Rich's may refer to:

 Rich's (department store), a department store chain that later became part of Macy's
 Rich's (discount store), a discount store chain which ceased operations in 1996
 Rich's Houston
 Rich Products, an American food products company